Cristina Malarky Gonzales Romualdez (born May 1, 1970) is a Filipina actress and a former politician.

Personal life
She is the daughter of actor José Mari Gonzales and Charito Malarky. She has a younger sister, Anna Margarita Gonzales, a former actress. Gonzales is of Spanish and British ancestry from her mother's side.

She is married to Alfred Romualdez (mayor of Tacloban City and nephew of Imelda Marcos). She served as city councilor from 2007 until 2016.

Controversies
In 1993, in an affair dubbed as Brunei Beauties by the Philippine media, Cristina Gonzales were among the names linked to the controversy.

During the 2016 Philippine Election, her daughter Sofia, who was underage the time, posted an offensive tweet on Twitter regarding Camarines Sur Rep. Leni Robredo. In a post on her Facebook, Romualdez apologized and said she did not approve of the words her daughter used in the controversial Twitter post.

Return to showbiz
After 15 years in politics, Gonzales signed with Viva Artists Agency last January 29, 2021 as she makes a showbiz comeback.

Pageantry
Gonzales, joining her first beauty pageant, was crowned Noble Queen of the Universe in the pageant's fourth edition held in Tokyo, Japan on December 29, 2022, the second Filipina to won such after fellow actress Patricia Javier in 2019. Represented the Philippines (Visayas), she was also proclaimed Ambassador of Humanity.

Filmography

Television

See also
Jasmin Selberg

Notes

References

1970 births
Filipino actor-politicians
Living people
20th-century Filipino actresses
Filipino child actresses
Filipino film actresses
People from Tacloban
Actresses from Leyte (province)
Politicians from Leyte (province)
Cristina
Filipino city and municipal councilors
Filipino people of British descent
Filipino people of Spanish descent
Women mayors of places in the Philippines
Mayors of places in Leyte (province)
Viva Artists Agency

External links